The Technical University of Denmark, often simply referred to as DTU, is a polytechnic university and school of engineering. It was founded in 1829 at the initiative of Hans Christian Ørsted as Denmark's first polytechnic, and it is today ranked among Europe's leading engineering institutions.

Along with École Polytechnique in Paris, École Polytechnique Fédérale de Lausanne, Eindhoven University of Technology, Technical University of Munich and Technion – Israel Institute of Technology, DTU is a member of EuroTech Universities Alliance.

History
DTU was founded in 1829 as the "College of Advanced Technology" (Danish: Den Polytekniske Læreanstalt). The Physicist Hans Christian Ørsted, at that time a professor at the University of Copenhagen, was one of the driving forces behind this initiative. He was inspired by the École Polytechnique in Paris, France which Ørsted had visited as a young scientist. The new institution was inaugurated on 5 November 1829 with Ørsted becoming its Principal, a position he held until his death in 1851.

The first home of the new college consisted of two buildings located in Studiestræde and St- Pederstræde in the center of Copenhagen. Although these buildings were expanded several times, they eventually became inadequate for the requirements of the college. In 1890 a new building complex was completed and inaugurated located in Sølvgade. The new buildings were designed by the architect Johan Daniel Herholdt.

In 1903, the College of Advanced Technology commenced the education of electrical engineers in addition to that of the construction engineers, the production engineers, and the mechanical engineers who already at that time were being educated at the college.

In the 1920s, space again became insufficient and in 1929 the foundation stone was laid for a new school at Østervold. Completion of this building was delayed by World War II and it was not completed before 1954.

From 1933, the institution was officially known as Danmarks tekniske Højskole (DtH), which commonly was translated into English, as the 'Technical University of Denmark'. On 1 April 1994, in connection with the joining of Danmarks Ingeniørakademi (DIA) and DTH, the Danish name was changed to Danmarks Tekniske Universitet, this done to include the word 'University' thus giving rise to the initials DTU by which the university is commonly known today. The formal name, Den Polytekniske Læreanstalt, Danmarks Tekniske Universitet, however, still includes the original name.

In 1960 a decision was made to move the College of Advanced Technology to new and larger facilities in Lyngby north of Copenhagen. They were inaugurated on 17 May 1974.

On 23 and 24 November 1967, the University Computing Center hosted the NATO Science Committee's Study Group first meeting discussing the newly coined term "Software Engineering".

On 1 January 2007, the university was merged with the following Danish research centers: Forskningscenter Risø, Danmarks Fødevareforskning, Danmarks Fiskeriundersøgelser (from 1 January 2008: National Institute for Aquatic Resources; DTU Aqua), Danmarks Rumcenter, and Danmarks Transport-Forskning.

Organization and administration
The university is governed by a board consisting of 10 members: Six members are recruited from outside the university and they form the majority of the board. One member is appointed by the scientific staff and one member is appointed by the administrative staff. Two members are appointed by the university students.

The President of DTU is appointed by the university board. The President in turn appoints the Deans, and the Deans appoint the Heads of the departments.

In 2014, DTU was granted institutional accreditation by the Danish Accreditation Institution (a member of ENQA). The institutional accreditation ensures that the quality assurance system of the institution is well-described, well-argued, and well-functioning in practice.

Since DTU has no faculty senate, and since the faculty is not involved in the appointment of the President, Deans, or Department heads, the university has no faculty governance.

Departments

 DTU Aqua, National Institute for Aquatic Resources
DTU Business, DTU Executive School of Business
DTU Cen, Center for Electron Nanoscopy
DTU Campus Village
DTU Centre for Technology Entrepreneurship
DTU Chemical Engineering, Department of Chemical and Biochemical Engineering
DTU Chemistry, Department of Chemistry
DTU Civil Engineering, Department of Civil Engineering
DTU Compute, Institut for Matematik og Computer Science
DTU Danchip, National Center for Micro and Nanofabrication
DTU Diplom, Department of Bachelor Engineering
DTU Electrical Engineering, Department of Electrical Engineering
DTU Environment, Department of Environmental Engineering
DTU Executive School of Business
DTU Food, National Food Institute
DTU Fotonik, Department of Photonics Engineering
DTU Management Engineering, Department of Management Engineering
DTU Mechanical Engineering, Department of Mechanical Engineering
DTU Nanotech, Department of Micro-and Nanotechnology
DTU Physics, Department of Physics
Risø DTU, National Laboratory for Sustainable Energy
DTU Space, National Space Institute
DTU Systems Biologi, Department of Systems Biology
DTU Library, Technical Information Center of Denmark
DTU Vet, National Veterinary Institute
DTU Wind Energi, Department of Wind Energy
DTU Transport, Department of Transport: The department provides Transportation and Logistics master's degree programs in engineering and technology. A PhD Programme is also offered.
DTU Mathematics

Research centers

Arctic Technology Centre
Center for Facilities Management
Center for Biological Sequence Analysis – chair Søren Brunak
Center for Information and Communication Technologies
Center for Microbial Biotechnology
Center for Phase Equilibria and Separation Processes
Center for Technology, Economics and Management
Center for Traffic and Transport
Centre for Applied Hearing Research
Centre for Electric Power and Energy
Combustion and Harmful Emission Control
The Danish Polymer Centre
IMM Statistical Consulting Center
International Centre for Indoor Environment and Energy
Centre for Advanced Food Studies
DTU Nanotech
DTU Fluid
DTU Food
EnergiDTU

Campus
The university is located on a plain known as Lundtoftesletten in the northeastern end of the city of Lyngby. The area was previously home to the airfield Lundtofte Flyveplads.

The campus is roughly divided in half by the road Anker Engelunds Vej going in the east–west direction, and, perpendicular to that, by two lengthy, collinear roads located on either side of a parking lot. The campus is thus divided into four parts, referred to as quadrants, numbered one through four in correspondence with the conventional numbering of quadrants in the Cartesian coordinate system with north upwards.

Controversy
DTU was the subject of controversy in 2009 because the (then) institute director of the Department of Chemistry, O.W. Sørensen, was a high-ranking member of Scientology. In relation to this, the university was accused of violating the principles of free speech by threatening to fire employees, among them Rolf W. Berg, who voiced their criticism of the institute director. On 7 April 2010, the successor of Sørensen was announced, at a department meeting, as Erling Stenby, who officially took over as Director on 1 May 2010.

Rankings

The university maintains an updated site with the university's standing in several relevant academic and research rankings. In November 2007 the Times Higher Education Supplement put the university as number 130 in their ranking of the universities of the world and number 122 in 2010.
In "The World's Most Innovative Universities" 2015 ranking by Thomson Reuters, DTU is ranked:
No. 1 in the Nordic countries
No. 43 in the World
In the "engineering" category in the QS subject rankings, DTU is ranked:
No. 2 in the Nordic countries
No. 36 in the World
On the Leiden Ranking's 2008 "crown indicator" list of Europe's 100 largest universities in terms of the number of Web of Science publications in the period 2000–2007, DTU is ranked:
No. 1 in the Nordic countries
No. 5 in Europe
In the 2022 QS World University Rankings DTU is ranked:
No. 99 in the World
In the 2013 Leiden Ranking DTU is ranked:
No. 45 in the World
No. 7 in Europe
In the 2013–2014 Times Higher Education World University Rankings DTU is ranked:
No. 121 in the World (No. 31 in the "Engineering & Technology" category)

Extracurricular organizations

Sports
Exiles RUFC is the official rugby union club of DTU.

Student organizations
168-year-old Polyteknisk Forening, as well as the maritime student association Nul-kryds formed in 1947.

Notable alumni and faculty

Henrik Pontoppidan, Nobel Prize in Literature laureate
Henrik Dam, Nobel Prize in Physiology or Medicine laureate
Morten Peter Meldal, Nobel Prize in Chemistry (2022) laureate
Harald Bohr (1887–1951), Olympic silver medalist football player and mathematician; brother of Niels Bohr
Johan Jensen, mathematician
Jorgen Arendt Jensen, scientist, engineer
Carsten Thomassen, mathematician
Ludwig A. Colding, physicist and civil engineer
Martin Knudsen, physicist
Morten Bo Madsen, physicist
Rodney Cotterill, physicist
Jakob Stoustrup, control theory scientist
Andreas Mogensen, astronaut
Ove  Arupur , founder of Arup Group
Per Vilhelm Brüel, co-founder of Brüel & Kjær
Craig R. Barrett, former CEO of Intel
Jørgen Lindegaard, former CEO of the SAS Group
Henrik O. Madsen, former CEO of DNV GL
Dines Bjørner, computer scientist
Anders Hejlsberg, software engineer
Henrik Wann Jensen, computer graphics researcher
Per Brinch Hansen, computer scientist
Jakob Nielsen, web usability consultant
Anker Engelund, civil engineer
Povl Ole Fanger, HVAC engineer
Peder Oluf Pedersen, electroacoustic engineer
Poul Henningsen, author, architect and critic
Ebbe Sand, former professional footballer
Haldor Topsøe, Founder and former chairman of Haldor Topsøe
Harald T. Friis, pioneering contributions to radio propagation, radio astronomy, and radar
Jingdong Zhang, electrochemist and microscopist
Jan S. Hesthaven, Chair of Computational Mathematics and Simulation Science, EPFL

See also
 Risø DTU National Laboratory for Sustainable Energy
 Top Industrial Managers for Europe (TIME), network for student mobility
 Technologist, magazine published by EuroTech Universities Alliance
 Open access in Denmark
Dana IV (ship)

References

External links

History of DTU
International Education at DTU
Map of the Lyngby DTU Campus
DTU Alumni Association

 
Educational institutions established in 1829
Engineering universities and colleges in Denmark
Science and technology in Copenhagen
1829 establishments in Denmark
Universities established in the 20th century
Universities and colleges formed by merger in Denmark